Junction 48 is a 2016 Israeli drama film directed by Udi Aloni, co-written by Oren Moverman and the film's star Tamer Nafar. It was shown in the Panorama section at the 66th Berlin International Film Festival where it won the Audience Award.

Plot
Karim, a young Arab from Lod, works for the Execution Office's Customer Service, and lives among drug dealers in the Middle East drug capital, but dreams of being a musician. The plot takes place in Lod and the character of Karim is based on the Palestinian rapper Tamer Nafar (who also plays his role), and who wrote the screenplay with Oren Moverman, as well as composed the music for the film (along with Itamar Ziegler of the Balkan Beat Box).

Cast
 Tamer Nafar as Kareem
 Samar Qupty as Manar
 Salwa Nakkara as Kareem's mother
 Saeed Dassuki as Talal
 Adeeb Safadi as Yousef
 Tarik Kopty as Abu Abdallah, Talal's father
 Sameh Zakout as Amir
 Ayed Fadel as Hussam
 Hisham Suliman as Shaikh
 Mariam Abu Khaled as Mariam

References

External links
 

2016 films
2016 drama films
Israeli drama films
2010s Arabic-language films
2010s Hebrew-language films
2016 multilingual films
Israeli multilingual films